Gerti Fesl (born 29 September 1931) is an Austrian gymnast. She competed at the 1948 Summer Olympics and the 1952 Summer Olympics.

References

1931 births
Living people
Austrian female artistic gymnasts
Olympic gymnasts of Austria
Gymnasts at the 1948 Summer Olympics
Gymnasts at the 1952 Summer Olympics
Place of birth missing (living people)
20th-century Austrian women